Collema coniophilum is a species of lichen in the family Collemataceae, first found in inland rainforests of British Columbia.

References

Peltigerales
Lichen species
Lichens described in 2009
Lichens of Western Canada
Fungi without expected TNC conservation status